Tajikistan competed at the 2017 Asian Winter Games in Sapporo and Obihiro, Japan from February 19 to 26. The country's athletes competed in one sport: alpine skiing. The team consisted of four athletes.

Background
All four athletes made their international debuts at the event. Bahriddin Ghoibov was originally scheduled to compete for the country at the 2011 games, but ultimately did not take part. The teams expenses for travel, accommodation, food etc. were covered by the organizing committee of the games.

Competitors
The following table lists the Tajik delegation per sport and gender.

Alpine skiing

Tajikistan competed in the alpine skiing events. The team consisted of four male athletes.

Men

See also
Tajikistan at the 2014 Winter Olympics

References

Nations at the 2017 Asian Winter Games
Tajikistan at the Asian Winter Games
2017 in Tajikistani sport